The Mastophoroideae are a subfamily of Corallinaceaen  coralline algae with uniporate conceptacles.

References

Bikont subfamilies
Corallinaceae